Diplodiscidae is a family of flatworms belonging to the order Plagiorchiida.

Genera:
 Catadiscus Cohn, 1904
 Diplodiscus Diesing, 1836
 Homalogaster Poirier, 1883
 Pseudodiplodiscus Manter, 1962

References

Platyhelminthes
Trematode genera